Crawfordsville Regional Airport  is a public use airport located  south of the central business district of Crawfordsville, a city in Montgomery County, Indiana, United States. The airport was founded in June 1945 and is owned by the
city. It is included in the Federal Aviation Administration (FAA) National Plan of Integrated Airport Systems for 2021–2025, in which it is categorized as a local general aviation facility.

Facilities and aircraft 
Crawfordsville Regional Airport covers an area of 279 acres (105 ha) at an elevation of 801 feet (244 m) above mean sea level. It has one runway:
4/22 is a 5,505 by 75 feet (1,526 X 23 m) asphalt runway with approved GPS and NDB approaches. The Crawfordsville NDB
navaid, (CFJ) frequency 388 kHz, is located on the field.

For the 12-month period ending December 31, 2019, the airport had 22,922 aircraft operations, an average of 63 per day: 66% local general aviation and 34% transient general aviation. 
In November 2021, there were 19 aircraft based at this airport: 17 single-engine and 2 multi-engine.

References

External links 

 
 

Airports in Indiana
Transportation buildings and structures in Montgomery County, Indiana